Cerro Aguja Sur is a mountain in the mountain range of the Andes, located in the Chubut Province of Argentina and Los Lagos Region of Chile. It is 2298 meters high, forming one of the majors elevations of the zone, and thus also one of the end points of the province of Chubut.

References

Aguja Sur
Aguja Sur
Landforms of Chubut Province
Landforms of Los Lagos Region
Argentina–Chile border
Aguja Sur